Waylon Forever is an outlaw country album by Waylon Jennings which was released on October 21, 2008 on the Vagrant Records label. The backing band for this album is Waylon's son Shooter and his band, The .357's.

Waylon's posthumous album reveals his final recordings of unheard material. Much of this album was recorded in the mid to late 1990s but was forgotten about until about 2007. Shooter and his band went in the studio to add the music to the original recordings. Dave Cobb produced.

Track listing
"Jack of Diamonds" (Daniel Moore) – 3:41
"Outlaw Shit" (Waylon Jennings) – 5:30 *This is a reworked, slower tempo version of "Don't You Think This Outlaw Bit's Done Got Out of Hand"
"Ain't Livin' Long Like This" (Rodney Crowell) – 4:36
"Are You Ready for the Country?" (Neil Young) – 4:01
"Lonesome On'ry and Mean" (Steve Young) – 4:21
"Waymore's Blues" (Waylon Jennings, Curtis Buck) – 5:01
"White Room" (Jack Bruce, Pete Brown) – 4:26
"I Found the Body" (Waylon Jennings, Shooter Jennings) – 4:03

Personnel
David Campbell - string arrangements, conductor
Jessi Colter - vocals
Shooter Jennings - acoustic guitar, electric guitar, keyboards, vocals
Waylon Jennings - acoustic guitar, electric guitar, vocals
Ted Russell Kamp - banjo, bass guitar, bouzouki
Bryan Keeling - cymbals, drums, percussion
Leroy Powell - acoustic guitar, electric guitar, harmonica
The Settles Connection - vocals
Robby Turner - pedal steel guitar
Lee Ann Womack - vocals

Chart performance

Waylon Jennings albums
2008 albums
Vagrant Records albums
Albums arranged by David Campbell (composer)
Albums produced by Dave Cobb